Erwin Jay Saunders, also known as E. Jay Saunders, is a Turks and Caicos Islands businessman and politician serving as the Deputy Premier of the Turks and Caicos Islands as of 20 February 2021. He is the son of former Chief Minister Norman Saunders and former Speaker of the House, Emily Saunders.

References

Progressive National Party (Turks and Caicos Islands) politicians
Turks and Caicos Islands politicians
Year of birth missing (living people)
Living people